was a Japanese sumo wrestler from Kesennuma, Mutsu Province. He was the sport's 9th yokozuna.

Career
Born , he later took the surname . He aspired to become a rikishi because his second brother was an ōzeki. He joined Hidenoyama stable in 1827 and made his debut in March 1828, under the shikona, or ring name, . Then, he wrestled for the   under the shikona . Due to the poor financial situation of the Matsuidara clan, he was removed from his position around 1827. After reaching the rank of sekiwake he was given the shikona  and reached ōzeki. However, it is said that his promotion was more of a fill-in for Shiranui's repeated failures to appear, and he was dropped back at sekiwake.

Yokozuna
He was not one of the greatest wrestlers of his time, but received the licence because he had influential backers and is even sometimes assimilated as a full member of the Yoshida family. Ōzeki Tsurugizan Taniemon reportedly handed over the yokozuna licence to Hidenoyama.

Retirement from sumo
He retired in March 1850, as he was 54 years old at the time, and is said to have performed in the yokozuna ring-entering ceremony until 1861. He recorded 30 consecutive wins and won the equivalent of six championships before the modern yūshō system was established. In the top makuuchi division, he won 112 bouts and lost 21 bouts, recording a winning percentage of 84.2. After his retirement, he was an elder known as Hidenoyama and trained later yokozuna Jinmaku. Hidenoyama died in June, 1862 and sekiwake Kasagiyama (笠置山) succeeded the name Hidenoyama.

The "Kaei turmoil"
Hidenoyama served as a judge (naka-aratame, modern shimpan) but this gave him many opportunities to give favourable decisions to his own pupils. At that time, there were many lower division wrestlers and they were sometimes forced to be absent from sumo bouts. They attempted to have their number of sumo bouts increased. He had the right of deciding their attendances and rejected this, excluding his own pupils. The other lower ranking wrestlers were angry, accusing him of bias, and went on strike because of his practices in 1851. It was the first walkout in sumo history and the event is now known as the 'Kaei turmoil' (嘉永の紛擾). Hidenoyama eventually apologized to the wrestlers.

Fighting style
He was not good at wrestling against skillful wrestlers like sekiwake Inagawa (稲川) and ōzeki , but he was able to compensate for his small size, roundness and fragility by training hard. He is also said to have a great fighting spirit.

Homage
A 10-ton bronze statue of Hidenoyama was erected in Kesennuma, Miyagi Prefecture, at the entrance of the bay. In 2011, the statue became a symbol of resilience after surviving the Great East Japan Earthquake.

Top division record 
The actual time the tournaments were held during the year in this period often varied.

  
    
    
  
  
    
    
  
  
    
    
  
  
    
    
  
  
    
    
  
  
    
    
  
  
    
    
  
  
    
    
  
  
    
    
  
  
    
    
  
  
    
    
  
  
    
    
  
  
    
    
  
  
    
    
  

*Championships for the best record in a tournament were not recognized or awarded before the 1909 summer tournament and the above unofficial championships are historically conferred. For more information see yūshō.

See also
Glossary of sumo terms
List of past sumo wrestlers
List of yokozuna

References

1808 births
1862 deaths
Japanese sumo wrestlers
Sumo people from Miyagi Prefecture
Yokozuna
People from Kesennuma, Miyagi
19th-century wrestlers